Jinja College is a Government Aided, Boys, Boarding, O and  A’ level School, found in Jinja (Uganda).

History
The school was founded in 1946 as a junior school by the Mill Hill Missionary fathers, when the administration of the Budini College decided to transfer the institution to a site with easy access to social amenities.  They moved to occupy the premises which had been vacated by the Franciscan Sisters. Fr. Mc Gough became the first head teacher of the new institution now named Jinja College. Initially, a private junior school (S.1 to S.3) became a government aided school and upgraded to secondary status (S.1 to S.4) in 1965 with Fr. Jone Jones as its head teacher. In 1981, the school was up graded again to A’ Level status (S.1–S.6), offering Arts and Science courses (subjects) with Mr. Boniface Kategano as the Head teacher.

The following have ever headed the school Mr. Ogutti Bichachi (1984-1996), Ag. Head teacher Mr. Oryema Anthony (1996)    Mr. Iisat Ignatius (1997-2001), Mr. Kawuki Joseph (2001-2013) and Mr. Isabirye Mathias (2013 to date).

Administration 
Jinja college is run according to an established administrative structure in the hierarchy below;
Ministry of Education and Sports, The Board of Governors, Head teacher, Deputy Head teacher, Staff, Students’ leadership and Students

Location 
District	:	JINJA
County		:	JINJA MUNICIPAL COUNCIL
Sub-County	:	KIMAKA – MPUMUDDE
Parish		:	RUBAGA
Distance from Jinja town centre: 1 Kilo meters.

Curriculum 
The following are 16 subjects offered at O’ LEVEL (S.1 – S.4)
1.	Mathematics *                                         9. English language*
2.	Literature in English                                 10. French language
3.	Physics*                                               11. Chemistry *
4.	Biology*                                              12.  Agriculture
5.	Technical Drawing                                      13. History*
6.	Geography*                                             14. Fine Art
7.	Christian Religious Education                         15.  Entrepreneurship
8.	Computer studies                                       16. Physical Education
At  A’ LEVEL  (S.5& S.6) the school offers the following subjects; 
Sciences                                                       
1.Mathematics                          
2. Physics                                 
3. Chemistry                             
4. Biology                                 
5. Agriculture                           
6. Technical Drawing      
Arts
7. Literature in English  
8. History                       
9. Geography
10. Christian Religious
11. Entrepreneurship
12. Art and craft
13. Economics         
14. General Paper

A combination of four subjects plus General paper is selected by the student from the above subjects depending on the student's ability and desired career.

Academic trends 
Despite challenges/shortcomings, there has been consistency in academic performance for the last ten years. The school is pursuing its academic targets with precision. Its target is that no student fails to go to the next level. The school has employed a multidimensional approach involving strengthening all academic departments, intensifying monitoring and evaluation of the implementation of academic programs, increasing and improving counseling services, building and maintaining physical infrastructures, improving management systems, improving and maintaining good discipline among others.

References

External links 
 Jinja College School Profile on School Net Africa 
 Jinja College Location on google maps 
 All Graduates: Old Boys of Jinja College 

Schools in Uganda
Educational institutions established in 1946
1946 establishments in the British Empire
Eastern Region, Uganda
Jinja, Uganda